Donald W. Parry Ph.D. is a professor of Hebrew Bible in the Department of Asian and Near Eastern Languages at Brigham Young University. He holds the Abraham O. Smoot Professorship. He is the author and editor of many works related to the Dead Sea Scrolls and the Hebrew Bible, Old Testament. He has been a member of the International Team of Translators of the Dead Sea Scrolls since January 1994. He served as a member of the Dead Sea Scrolls Foundation Board of Advisors, 2008–present and presently serves as a member of the Dead Sea Scrolls Foundation Board of Trustees.

He has authored or edited more than forty books, and has written and published more than eighty articles. He was written widely on the books of Isaiah, for both scholarly and general audiences. Many of his publications deal with the Isaiah Dead Sea Scrolls, including his recently published Exploring the Isaiah Scrolls and Their Textual Variants (Leiden: E. J. Brill, 2020, 509 + pages, including 5 appendices), which deals with all of the Dead Sea Scrolls copies of Isaiah. He has also published works on the books of Samuel, ancient temples and their significance, and various topics dealing with the Hebrew Bible. For the scholarly community, Parry treats various topics, such as paleography, lexical meanings, orthography, ancient scribal practices, textual affiliations, and corpus-based examination of linguistic features.

In addition to writing six books on Isaiah, Parry brings twenty-seven years of work on the Dead Sea Scrolls. As one of the scrolls' international team of translators, he has published the Books of Samuel, the twenty-one Isaiah Dead Sea Scrolls Isaiah, and has authored or edited more than fifteen volumes on the Dead Sea Scrolls. These include scholarly works as well as publications for popular audiences.

He is a member of several other organizations, including the International Organization for the Study of the Old Testament (Groningen, The Netherlands), Society for Biblical Literature (Atlanta, Georgia), and the National Association of Professors of Hebrew (Madison, Wisconsin).

Parry is the Cofounding Director (with Jennifer A. Mackley, Seattle, Washington) and a member of the Board of Directors of the Wilford Woodruff Papers Foundation.

Selected bibliography

Books (some titles have co-authors)

Books—Dead Sea Scrolls/Hebrew Bible (academic focus) 

 Exploring the Isaiah Scrolls and Their Textual Variants. Leiden: E. J. Brill, 2020. i–xiv; + 509 pages, including 5 appendices.
 Seek Ye Words of Wisdom: Studies of the Book of Mormon, Bible, and Temple in Honor of Stephen D. Ricks. Edited with Gaye Strathearn and Shon D. Hopkin. Provo, UT: Interpreter, 2020. i–xxxiv; + 382 pages
 Chiasmus: The State of the Art. Edited with John W. Welch. Provo, UT: A Supplement to BYU Studies Quarterly, 2020. 360 pages
 The Prophetic Voice at Qumran: The Leonardo Museum Conference on the Dead Sea Scrolls, 11–12 April 2014. Edited with Stephen D. Ricks. STDJ 120. Leiden: E. J. Brill, The Netherlands, 2017.
 Dead Sea Scrolls Handbook. Edited with Devorah Dimant. Leiden: E. J. Brill, 2015. i–xxv; + 985 pages
 The Dead Sea Scrolls Reader, Second Edition, Revised and Expanded, Volume 1. Texts Concerned with Religious Law, Exegetical Texts and Parabiblical Texts. Edited with Emanuel Tov. Leiden: E. J. Brill, 2014. i–xxix, + 1085 pages, I–XVI
 The Dead Sea Scrolls Reader, Second Edition, Revised and Expanded, Volume 2. Calendrical Texts and Sapiential Texts, Poetic and Liturgical Texts, Additional Genres and Unclassified Texts. Edited with Emanuel Tov. Leiden: E. J. Brill, 2014. i–xxxiii; + 1133 pages
 Qumran Cave 1 Revisited: Texts from Cave 1 Sixty Years after their Discovery: Proceedings of the Sixth Meeting of the IOQS in Ljubljana. Edited with Daniel K. Falk, Sarianna Metso, and Eibert J. C. Tigchelaar. Leiden: E. J. Brill, 2010. i–vii; + 290 pages
 Coauthored with Frank Moore Cross et al. Discoveries in the Judaean Desert: 4QSama, Vol. XVII. Oxford: Clarendon Press, 2005. i–xix, + 325 pages; Plates I–XXVII
 The Dead Sea Scrolls Reader: Poetic and Liturgical Texts. Edited with Emanuel Tov. Leiden: E. J. Brill, 2005. i–xxiv, + 525 pages, I–XIII
 The Dead Sea Scrolls Reader: Parabiblical Texts. Edited with Emanuel Tov. Leiden: E. J. Brill, 2005. i–xxxiii; + 649 pages, I–XII
 The Dead Sea Scrolls Reader: Additional Genres and Unclassified Texts. Edited with Emanuel Tov. Leiden: E. J. Brill, 2005. i–xxiv; + 347 pages, I–XXII
 The Dead Sea Scrolls Reader: Exegetical Texts. Edited with Emanuel Tov. Leiden: E. J. Brill, 2004. i–xix; + 167 pages, I–XIII
 The Dead Sea Scrolls Reader: Calendrical and Sapiential Texts. Edited with Emanuel Tov. Leiden: E. J. Brill, 2004. i–xxiv; + 319 pages
 The Dead Sea Scrolls Reader: Texts Concerned with Religious Law. Edited with Emanuel Tov. Leiden: E. J. Brill, 2004. i–xxii; + 363 pages, I–XIII
 The Provo International Conference on the Dead Sea Scrolls: New Texts, Reformulated Issues, and Technological Innovations. Edited with Eugene C. Ulrich. Leiden: E. J. Brill, 1998. i–viii; + 711 pages
 Coauthored with Elisha Qimron. A New Edition of the Great Isaiah Scroll (1QIsaa): Transcriptions and Photographs. Leiden: E. J. Brill, 1998. i–xxi; + 109 pages
 Current Research and Technological Developments: Proceedings of the Conference on the Judaean Desert Scrolls, Jerusalem, April 30, 1995. Edited with Stephen D. Ricks. Leiden: E. J. Brill, 1996. i–vi; + 279 pages

Book(s)—Reference (Dead Sea Scrolls) 

 A Bibliography of the Finds in the Desert of Judah, 1970–1995: Arranged by Author with Subject and Scriptural Indices. Edited with Florentino García Martínez. Leiden: E. J. Brill, 1996. i–viii; + 561 pages

Selected Copyrighted Software (Dead Sea Scrolls/Hebrew Bible/Other) 

 The Dead Sea Scrolls Electronic Reference Library: Biblical Texts, Vol. 2 (Leiden: E. J. Brill, 2015) [with Emanuel Tov and Eugene Ulrich]
 Biblical Hebrew Learning Tool. Online Tool. Creative Works. Brigham Young University, 2021.
 The Dead Sea Scrolls Electronic Reference Library: Nonbiblical Texts, Vol. 1. Leiden: E. J. Brill, 1999. [with Emanuel Tov]
 The Dead Sea Scrolls on CD: Transcriptions of the Qumran Nonbiblical Texts, with
 English Translation, Images, Catalog, Hebrew Bible, and Septuagint. Provo: FARMS, 1998.

Selected Articles (academic) 

 Parry, Donald W. “Contextual Errors in 1QIsaa: How the Scribe Was Impacted by His Textual Environment,” in Fountains of Wisdom: In Conversation with James H. Charlesworth (London: Bloomsbury, 2022), 387–401. 
“Contextual Errors in 1QIsaa: How the Scribe Was Impacted by His Textual Environment.” Fountains of Wisdom: In Conversation with James H. Charlesworth. T&T Clark (forthcoming in 2021)
 “Late Biblical Hebrew Forms in 1QIsaa,” Sacred Texts and Disparate Interpretations Qumran Manuscripts Seventy Years Later, Proceedings of the International Conference Held at the John Paul II Catholic University of Lublin, 24–26 October 2017, edited by Henryk Drawnel. Leiden: E. J. Brill, 2020, 209–235.
 “Eve’s Role As a ‘Help’ (‘ezer) Revisited,” in Seek Ye Words of Wisdom: Studies of the Book of Mormon, Bible, and Temple in Honor of Stephen D. Ricks, edited by Donald W. Parry, Gaye Strathearn, and Shon D. Hopkin. Provo, UT: Interpreter, 2020, 223–242.
 “Chiasmus in the Text of Isaiah: MT Isaiah Versus the Great Isaiah Scroll (1QIsaa),” in
 Chiasmus: The State of the Art, edited by John W. Welch and Donald W. Parry. A
 supplemental Issue of BYU Studies Quarterly. Provo, UT, 2020, 107–127.
 “Were There Two Copies of Genesis in Qumran Cave 2?” Revue de Qumran 30(1) (2018); 65–68.
 “A Text-Critical Study of Hapax Legomena in MT Isaiah and the Qumran Isaiah Scrolls,” in Reading the Bible in Ancient Traditions and Modern Editions: Studies in Memory of Peter W. Flint. Edited by Andrew B. Perrin, Kyung S. Baek, and Daniel K. Falk. Atlanta: SBL Press, 2017, 307–330.
 “Artificial Forms in the Great Isaiah Scroll (1QIsaa),” in The Prophetic Voice at
 Qumran: The Leonardo Museum Conference on the Dead Sea Scrolls, 11–12 April 2014.
 STDJ 120. E. J. Brill, The Netherlands, 2017, 83–96.
 “The Great Isaiah Scroll (1QIsaa)—Handbook for Textual Variants,” in “To Seek the Law of the Lord”: Essays in Honor of John W. Welch. Edited by Paul Y. Hoskisson and Daniel C. Peterson. Interpreter Foundation, Orem, UT, 2017, 247–266.
 Translation of forty-one Aramaic scrolls from Qumran: 4Q203 4QEnochGiants; 4Q206 4QEnochGiants; 4Q213a 4QLevi-a; 4Q531 4QEnochGiants; 4Q541 4QapocLevi a-b?; 4Q550 4QPrEsther-a; 4Q552 4QFour Kingdoms-a; 4Q553 4QFour Kingdoms-b; 4Q553a 4QFour Kingdoms-c; 4Q554 4QNewJerusalem-a; 4Q554a 4QNewJerusalem-b; 4Q555 4QNewJerusalem-c; 4Q556 4QVision-a; 4Q556a 4QProphecy-b; 4Q557 4QVision-c; 4Q558 4QpapVision-b; 4Q558a 4QpapUnid.; 4Q559 4QpapBiblicalChronology; 4Q560 4QExorcism; 4Q561 4QPhysiognomy/Horoscope; 4Q562 4QUnid. Text A; 4Q563 4QWisdom Composition; 4Q564 4QUnid. Text B; 4Q565 4QVision-c?; 4Q566 4QProphecy-c?; 4Q567 4QUnid. Text C; 4Q568 4QProphecy-d; 4Q569 4QProverbs; 4Q570 4QUnid. Text D; 4Q571 4QWords of Michael-a; 4Q572 4QUnid. Text E; 4Q573 4QUnid. Text F; 4Q574 4QUnid. Text G; 4Q575 4QVision-d; 4Q575a 4QUnid. Text H; 4Q577 4QText Mentioning the Flood; 4Q578 4QHistorical Text B; 4Q579 4QHymnic Work?; 4Q580 4QTestament-a; 4Q581 4QTestament-b?; 4Q582 4QTestament-c; 4Q583 4QProphecy-c; 4Q584a-x 4QUnid. Fragments A; 4Q585a-z 4QUnid. Fragments B; 4Q586a-n 4QUnid. Fragments C; 4Q587 4QTestament-d. In Dead Sea Scrolls Reader, 2nd Ed. Edited by Donald W. Parry and Emanuel Tov. Leiden: E. J. Brill, 2014.
 “Ancient Sacred Vestments: Scriptural Symbols and Meanings,” The Temple on Mount Zion, in Memory of Matthew Brown, September 22, 2012. Edited by William J. Hamblin and David Seeley. Salt Lake City: Eborn Books, 2014, 219–239.
 “LXX Isaiah or Its Vorlage—Primary ‘Misreadings’ and Secondary Modifications,” in A Teacher for All Generations: Essays in Honor of James C. VanderKam.Leiden: E. J. Brill, 2012, 151–168.
 “The Cherubim, the Flaming Sword, the Path, and the Tree of Life,” in The Tree of Life: From Eden to Eternity. Salt Lake City: Deseret Book; Provo: Neal A. Maxwell Institute, 2011, 1–24.
 “almanah (widow),” Theologisches Wörterbuch zu den Qumrantexten. Edited by Heinz-Josef Fabry. Stuttgart: W. Kohlhammer GmbH, 2011. [in German]
 “Isaiah Scrolls,” in The Eerdmans Dictionary of Early Judaism. Edited by John J. Collins and Daniel C. Harlow. Grand Rapids, MI: William B. Eerdmans, 2010, 776–778.
 “1QIsaa and Ketib–Qere Readings of the Masoretic Type Texts,” in Qumran Cave 1 Revisited: Texts from Cave 1 Sixty Years after their Discovery: Proceedings of the Sixth Meeting of the IOQS in Ljubljana. Leiden: Brill, 2010, 17–32.
 “Hannah in the Presence of the Lord.” Archaeology of the Books of Samuel: The Entangling of the Textual and Literary History, edited by Philippe Hugo and Adrian Schenker. Supplements to Vetus Testamentum [132]. Leiden: E. J. Brill, 2010, 53–73.
Parry, Donald W. “The Dead Sea Scrolls Bible,” Studies in the Bible and Antiquity 2 (2010): 1–27.  
 Coauthored with Frank Moore Cross. “4QSama and 4QSamb,” The Biblical Qumran Scrolls: Transcriptions and Textual Variants. Edited by Eugene Ulrich. Leiden: E. J. Brill, 2009, 259–322.
 Coauthored with Gordon W. Romney. “A Digital Signature Signing Engine to Protect the Integrity of Digital Assets,” Institute of Electrical and Electronics Engineers, Information Technology Based Higher Education and Training 2006 Conference, Sydney, Australia, July 2006.
 “Parchment,” The New Interpreter’s Dictionary of the Bible, Katharine D. Sakenfeld, general editor. Nashville, TN: Abingdon Press, 2009, 382.
 “Pen,” The New Interpreter’s Dictionary of the Bible, Katharine D. Sakenfeld, general editor. Nashville, TN: Abingdon Press, 2009, 429–430.
 “The Textual Character of the Unique Readings of 4QSama (4Q51)” Flores Florentino: Dead Sea Scrolls and Other Early Jewish Studies in Honour of Florentino García Martínez. Festschrift Presented in Honor of Florentino García Martínez, edited by Anthony Hilhorst, et al. Leiden: E. J. Brill, 2007, 163–182.
 “Verbal Imperative Variations in Qumran Legal Texts and Other Registers,” Zaphenath-Paneah: Linguistic studies Presented to Elisha Qimron On the Occasion of His Sixty-
 Fifth Birthday, edited by Daniel Sivan, David Talshir and Chaim Cohen. Ben-Gurion University of the Negev Press, 2009, 115, 127–142.
 “4QSama, the Canon, and the Community of Lay Readers,” The Bible and the Dead Sea
 Scrolls, vol. 1, edited by James H. Charlesworth. Baylor University Press, 2006,
 167–182.
 “Linguistic Profile of the Nonbiblical Qumran Texts: A Multidimensional Approach,” From 4QMMT to Resurrection: Mélanges qumraniens en hommage à Émile Puech, edited by Florentino García Martínez, Annette Steudel and Eibert Tigchelaar. Leiden: E. J. Brill, 2006, 217–241.
 “How Many Vessels? An Examination of MT 1 Sam 2:14//4QSama 1 Sam 2:16,” Studies in the Hebrew Bible, Qumran, and the Septuagint. Presented to Eugene Ulrich, edited by Peter Flint, Emanuel Tov, and James VanderKam. Leiden: E. J. Brill, 2006, 84–95.
 “The ‘Word’ or the ‘Enemies’ of the Lord? Revisiting the Euphemism in 2 Sam 12:14,” Studies in Hebrew Bible, Septuagint, and Dead Sea Scrolls in Honor of Emanuel Tov, edited by Shalom Paul, et al. Leiden: E. J. Brill, 2003, 367–378.
 “Unique Readings in 4QSama,” in The Bible as Book: The Hebrew Bible and the Judaean Desert Discoveries. Proceedings of the Conference Held at Hampton Court, Herefordshire, 18–21 June 2000, edited by Edward D. Herbert and Emanuel Tov. London: The British Library and Oak Knoll Press, 2002, 209–219.
 “Who Shall Ascend into the Mountain of the Lord?”: Three Biblical Temple Entrance
 Hymns,” in Reason, Revelation, and Faith: Essays in Honor of Truman G. Madsen, edited with Daniel C. Peterson and Stephen D. Ricks. Provo: FARMS, 2002, 729–742.
 “The Challenge of 4QSama and the Canon,” in The Bible and the Dead Sea Scrolls, edited by James H. Charlesworth. N. Richland, TX: Bibal Press, 2001, 219–239.
 “4QSama and the Royal Song of Thanksgiving (2 Sam 22/ /Ps 18),” in Sapiential, Liturgical and Poetical Texts from Qumran. Proceedings of the Third Meeting of the International Organization for Qumran Studies, Oslo, 1998. Edited by Daniel Falk, et al. Leiden: Brill, 2000, 146–159.
 “The Aftermath of Abner’s Murder,” Textus 20 (2000): 83–96.
 “More Fragments from 4QSama (4Q51): A Preliminary Edition of 1 Samuel 14:24–24:22,” The Dead Sea Scrolls—Fifty Years after Their Discovery: Proceedings of the Jerusalem Congress, July 20–25, 1997, edited by Lawrence H. Schiffman, Emanuel Tov, and James C. VanderKam. Jerusalem: Israel Exploration Society, 2000, 19–29.
 “Messiah Becomes the New King: Notes on Isaiah 9:3–7,” in The Disciple as Scholar: Essays on Scripture and the Ancient World in Honor of Richard Lloyd Anderson, edited with Stephen D. Ricks and Andrew Hedges. Provo: FARMS, 2000, 305–321.
 Coauthored with David V. Arnold, et al. “New Technological Advances: DNA, Electronic Databases, and Imaging Radar,” in The Dead Sea Scrolls After Fifty Years: A Comprehensive Assessment, edited by Peter W. Flint and James C. VanderKam. Leiden: E. J. Brill, 1998, 496–515.
 “Presentation of Volume Two of the Dead Sea Scrolls Electronic Reference Library,” in The Provo International Conference on the Dead Sea Scrolls: New Texts, Reformulated Issues, and Technological Innovations, edited by Donald W. Parry and Eugene C. Ulrich. Leiden: E. J. Brill, 1998.
 “4QSama (4Q51): A Preliminary Edition of 1 Sam 25:3–31:4,” in The Provo International Conference on the Dead Sea Scrolls: New Texts, Reformulated Issues, and Technological Innovations, edited by Donald W. Parry and Eugene C. Ulrich. Leiden: E. J. Brill, 1998, 58–71.
 Coauthored with Frank Moore Cross. “A Preliminary Edition of a Fragment of 4QSamb (4Q52),” Bulletin of American Schools of Oriental Research 306 (1997): 63–74.
 “Notes on Divine Name Avoidance in Scriptural Units of the Legal Texts of Qumran,” in Qumran Legal Texts: Essays in Honor of Joseph M. Baumgarten. Edited by Moshe Bernstein. Leiden: E. J. Brill, 1997, 437–449.
 “Retelling Samuel: Echoes of the Books of Samuel in the Dead Sea Scrolls,” Revue de Qumran 17 (Decembre 1996): 293–306.
 “4QSama and the Tetragrammaton,” in Current Research and Technological Developments: Proceedings of the Conference on the Judaean Desert Scrolls, Jerusalem, April 30, 1995. Leiden: E. J. Brill, 1996, 106–125.
 “The Dead Sea Scroll CD–ROM Database Project,” in Current Research and Technological Developments: Proceedings of the Conference on the Judaean Desert Scrolls, Jerusalem, April 30, 1995. Leiden: E. J. Brill, 1996, 240–250.
 Selected Books—Specialized Religious Studies/Mormon Studies
 175 Temple Symbols and Their Meanings. Salt Lake City: Deseret Book, 2020. i–ix; + 310 pages
 Preserved in Translation: Hebraisms and Other Ancient Literary Forms in the Book of Mormon. Provo, Utah: Religious Studies Center/Salt Lake City: Deseret Book, 2020. i–xxxi; + 158 pages
 The Temple: Ancient & Restored. Proceedings of the Second Interpreter Matthew B. Brown Memorial Conference, 25 October 2014. Edited with Stephen D. Ricks. Orem, UT: Interpreter Foundation, 2016.
 Angels: Agents of Light, Love, and Power. Salt Lake City: Deseret Book, 2013. i–ix; + 261 pages
 The Tree of Life: From Eden to Eternity. Edited with John W. Welch. Salt Lake City: Deseret Book; Provo: Neal A. Maxwell Institute, 2011. i–xvi; + 280 pages
 Coauthored with Jay A. Parry. Symbols and Shadows: Unlocking A Deeper Understanding of the Atonement. Salt Lake: Deseret Book, 2009. 378 pages
 Poetic Parallelisms in the Book of Mormon. Provo: Neal A. Maxwell Institute for Religious Scholarship, Brigham Young University, 2007. i–xliv, + 578 pages
 Coauthored with Jay A. Parry. Understanding the Parables of Jesus Christ. Salt Lake City: Deseret Book, 2006. i–xxii; + 290 pages
 Coauthored with Jay A. Parry. Understanding Death and Resurrection. Salt Lake City: Deseret Book, 2003.
 Reason, Revelation, and Faith: Essays in Honor of Truman G. Madsen. Edited with Daniel C. Peterson and Stephen D. Ricks. Provo: FARMS, 2002. i–liii; + 808 pages
 Echoes and Evidences of the Book of Mormon. Edited with Daniel C. Peterson and John W. Welch. Provo: Institute for the Preservation and Study of Ancient Religious Texts, Brigham Young University, 2002. i–xv; + 495 pages
 Visualizing Isaiah. Provo: BYU Institute for the Study and Preservation of Ancient Religious Texts, 2001. i–xi, + 139 pages
 The Disciple as Witness: Essays on Latter-day Saint History and Doctrine in Honor of Richard Lloyd Anderson. Edited with Stephen D. Ricks and Andrew Hedges. Provo: FARMS, 2000. i–viii; + 600 pages
 The Disciple as Scholar: Essays on Scripture and the Ancient World in Honor of Richard Lloyd Anderson. Edited with Stephen D. Ricks and Andrew Hedges. Provo: FARMS, 2000. i–vii; + 669 pages
 Coauthored with Jay A. Parry. Understanding the Signs of the Times. Salt Lake City: Deseret Book, 1999. i–xii; + 556 pages
 The Temple in Time and Eternity. Edited with Stephen D. Ricks. Provo: FARMS, 1999. i–xii; + 370 pages
 Coauthored with Jay A. Parry. Understanding the Book of Revelation. Salt Lake City: Deseret Book, 1998. 358 pages
 Coauthored with Jay A. Parry and Tina M. Peterson. Understanding Isaiah. Salt Lake City: Deseret Book, 1998. 659 pages
 Isaiah in the Book of Mormon. Edited with John W. Welch. Provo: FARMS, 1997. i–x; + 545 pages
 Temples of the Ancient World: Ritual and Symbolism, editor. Salt Lake City: Deseret Book, 1994. i–xxiv; + 805 pages
 Symbolik in der heiligen Schrift. Bad Reichenhall: LDS Books, 1993. Translation of A Guide to Scriptural Symbols.
 The Book of Mormon Text Reformatted according to Parallelistic Structure. Provo: FARMS, 1992. i–li; + 490 pages
 With Joseph Fielding McConkie. A Guide to Scriptural Symbols. Salt Lake City: Bookcraft, 1990. 193 pages
 A Bibliography on Temples of the Ancient Near East and Mediterranean World. Edited with Stephen D. Ricks and John W. Welch. New York: Edwin Mellen Press, 1991. i–viii; + 311 pages

Selected Books—Specialized Religious Studies/Mormon Studies 

 175 Temple Symbols and Their Meanings. Salt Lake City: Deseret Book, 2020. i–ix; + 310 pages
 Preserved in Translation: Hebraisms and Other Ancient Literary Forms in the Book of Mormon. Provo, Utah: Religious Studies Center/Salt Lake City: Deseret Book, 2020. i–xxxi; + 158 pages
 The Temple: Ancient & Restored. Proceedings of the Second Interpreter Matthew B. Brown Memorial Conference, 25 October 2014. Edited with Stephen D. Ricks. Orem, UT: Interpreter Foundation, 2016.
 Angels: Agents of Light, Love, and Power. Salt Lake City: Deseret Book, 2013. i–ix; + 261 pages
 The Tree of Life: From Eden to Eternity. Edited with John W. Welch. Salt Lake City: Deseret Book; Provo: Neal A. Maxwell Institute, 2011. i–xvi; + 280 pages
 Coauthored with Jay A. Parry. Symbols and Shadows: Unlocking A Deeper Understanding of the Atonement. Salt Lake: Deseret Book, 2009. 378 pages
 Poetic Parallelisms in the Book of Mormon. Provo: Neal A. Maxwell Institute for Religious Scholarship, Brigham Young University, 2007. i–xliv, + 578 pages
 Coauthored with Jay A. Parry. Understanding the Parables of Jesus Christ. Salt Lake City: Deseret Book, 2006. i–xxii; + 290 pages
 Coauthored with Jay A. Parry. Understanding Death and Resurrection. Salt Lake City: Deseret Book, 2003.
 Reason, Revelation, and Faith: Essays in Honor of Truman G. Madsen. Edited with Daniel C. Peterson and Stephen D. Ricks. Provo: FARMS, 2002. i–liii; + 808 pages
 Echoes and Evidences of the Book of Mormon. Edited with Daniel C. Peterson and John W. Welch. Provo: Institute for the Preservation and Study of Ancient Religious Texts, Brigham Young University, 2002. i–xv; + 495 pages
 Visualizing Isaiah. Provo: BYU Institute for the Study and Preservation of Ancient Religious Texts, 2001. i–xi, + 139 pages
 The Disciple as Witness: Essays on Latter-day Saint History and Doctrine in Honor of Richard Lloyd Anderson. Edited with Stephen D. Ricks and Andrew Hedges. Provo: FARMS, 2000. i–viii; + 600 pages
 The Disciple as Scholar: Essays on Scripture and the Ancient World in Honor of Richard Lloyd Anderson. Edited with Stephen D. Ricks and Andrew Hedges. Provo: FARMS, 2000. i–vii; + 669 pages
 Coauthored with Jay A. Parry. Understanding the Signs of the Times. Salt Lake City: Deseret Book, 1999. i–xii; + 556 pages
 The Temple in Time and Eternity. Edited with Stephen D. Ricks. Provo: FARMS, 1999. i–xii; + 370 pages
 Coauthored with Jay A. Parry. Understanding the Book of Revelation. Salt Lake City: Deseret Book, 1998. 358 pages
 Coauthored with Jay A. Parry and Tina M. Peterson. Understanding Isaiah. Salt Lake City: Deseret Book, 1998. 659 pages
 Isaiah in the Book of Mormon. Edited with John W. Welch. Provo: FARMS, 1997. i–x; + 545 pages
 Temples of the Ancient World: Ritual and Symbolism, editor. Salt Lake City: Deseret Book, 1994. i–xxiv; + 805 pages
 Symbolik in der heiligen Schrift. Bad Reichenhall: LDS Books, 1993. Translation of A Guide to Scriptural Symbols.
 The Book of Mormon Text Reformatted according to Parallelistic Structure. Provo: FARMS, 1992. i–li; + 490 pages
 With Joseph Fielding McConkie. A Guide to Scriptural Symbols. Salt Lake City: Bookcraft, 1990. 193 pages
 A Bibliography on Temples of the Ancient Near East and Mediterranean World. Edited with Stephen D. Ricks and John W. Welch. New York: Edwin Mellen Press, 1991. i–viii; + 311 pages

Selected Books—Dead Sea Scrolls (for non–specialists) 

 Illuminating the Dead Sea Scrolls: Mysteries of Qumran Revealed. Two imprints: The Leonardo, Salt Lake City; Maxwell Institute, Provo, UT, 2014. i–ix; + 91 pages, with photos and illustrations
 Die Schriftrollen vom Toten Meer: Fragen und Antworten für Heilige der Letzten Tage. LDS Books Schubert & Roth OHG, Bad Reichenhall, 2005. 111 pages. Translation of The Dead Sea Scrolls: Questions and Responses for Latter-day Saints
 With Stephen D. Ricks. The Dead Sea Scrolls: Questions and Responses for Latter–day Saints. Provo: FARMS, 2000. i–xiii; + 93 pages
 LDS Perspectives on the Dead Sea Scrolls. Edited with Dana M. Pike. Provo: FARMS, 1997. i–xxi; + 225 pages

Notes

References 
 https://web.archive.org/web/20080914033904/http://farms.byu.edu/authors/?authorID=44
 BYU bio
 Deseret Book bio.

Year of birth missing (living people)
Living people
Latter Day Saints from Idaho
University of Utah alumni
Hebrew University of Jerusalem alumni
Brigham Young University faculty
Latter Day Saint biblical scholars